The 2015 IPC Ice Sledge Hockey World Championships for A-Pool teams (Canada, Czech Republic, Germany, Italy, Japan, Norway, Russia, United States) was held at HarborCenter in Buffalo, New York, United States, from April 26 through May 3, 2015.

This was the final time the event was known as the "IPC Ice Sledge Hockey World Championships". On November 30, 2016, the International Paralympic Committee adopted the "World Para" brand across the ten sports it governs, the official name of the sport changed from "sledge hockey" to "Para ice hockey", and the event became the World Para Ice Hockey Championships.

The World Championships for B-Pool teams (Austria, Great Britain, Poland, Slovakia, South Korea, Sweden) was held at Östersund Arena in Östersund, Sweden, from March 15 to March 21, 2015.

A-Pool

Team rosters
 Canada 
 Forwards: Kieran Block, Brad Bowden, Billy Bridges, Chris Cederstrand, Ben Delaney, Marc Dorion, Tyler McGregor, Bryan Sholomicki, Kevin Sorley, Greg Westlake
 Defenders: Steve Arsenault, Adam Dixon, James Gemmell, Kevin Rempel, Derek Whitson
 Goaltenders: Dominic Larocque, Corbin Watson

 Czech Republic 
 Forwards: Michal Geier, Zdeněk Hábl, Zdeněk Krupička, Martin Novak, David Palát, Jiří Raul, Zdeněk Šafránek
 Defenders: Jiří Berger, Miroslav Hrbek, Pavel Kubeš, David Motyčka
 Goaltenders: Jan Matoušek, Michal Vápenka

 Germany 
 Forwards: Bas Disveld, Bernhard Hering, Ingo Kuhli-Lauenstein, Frank Rennhack, Felix Schrader, Sven Stumpe, Joerg Wedde, Jacob Wolff
 Defenders: Christian Jaster, Robert Pabst, Christian Pilz, Lucas Sklorz
 Goaltenders: Klaus Brzoska, Simon Kunst

 Italy 
 Forwards: Andrea Chiarotti, Valerio Corvino, Christoph Depaoli, Sandro Kalegaris, Nils Larch, Gregory Leperdi, Andrea Macri, Florian Planker, Roberto Radice, Werner Winker
 Defenders: Bruno Balossetti, Gianluigi Rosa
 Goaltenders: Gabriele Araudo, Santino Stillitano

 Japan 
 Forwards: Susumu Hirose, Hideaki Ishii, Masaharu Kumagai, Nao Kodama, Tomohiko Maruo, Toshiyuki Nakamura, Taimei Shiba, Yoshihiro Shioya, Kazuhiro Takahashi, Mamoru Yoshikawa
 Defenders: Wataru Horie, Eiji Misawa, Kazuya Mochizuki, Satoru Sudo
 Goaltenders: Shinobu Fukushima, Mitsuru Nagase

 Norway 
 Forwards: Thommas Avdal, Audun Bakke, Magnus Bøgle, Martin Hamre, Emil Kirstistuen, Jan Roger Klakegg, Rolf Einar Pedersen, Tor Joakim Rivera, Loyd Remi Pallander Solberg, Emil Sørheim, Stig Tore Svee
 Defenders: Thomas Jacobsen, Knut Andre Nordstoga, Morten Værnes
 Goaltenders: Kjell Christian Hamar, Roger Johansen

 Russia 
 Forwards: Alexey Amosov, Maxim Kuzminykh, Dmitrii Lisov, Sergei Panfilov, Nikolay Terentyev, Vasili Varlakov, Ilia Volkov
 Defenders: Ivan Berdnik, Mikhail Chekmarev, Ivan Kuznetsov, Vladimir Litvinenko, Aleksei Lysov, Alexander Pulin, Vadim Selyukin, Andrey Sokolov
 Goaltenders: Andrei Kasatkin, Evegnii Plotnikov

 United States 
 Forwards: Chris Douglas, Declan Farmer, Dan McCoy, Luke McDermott, Kevin McKee, Josh Misiewicz, Adam Page, Brody Roybal, Paul Schaus, Josh Sweeney
 Defenders: Tyler Carron, Billy Hanning, Nikko Landeros, Sam Mumper, Josh Pauls
 Goaltenders: Steve Cash, Kyle Huckaby

Preliminary round
All times are local (UTC–4).

Group A

Group B

Classification round

Bracket

5–8th place semifinals

Seventh place game

Fifth place game

Final round

Bracket

Semifinals

Bronze medal game

Final

Final standings

B-Pool

Results
All times are local (UTC+1).

References

External links 
 
 Results book – A-Pool
 Results book – B-Pool

World Para Ice Hockey Championships
IPC Ice Sledge Hockey World Championships
Sports competitions in Buffalo, New York
International ice hockey competitions hosted by the United States
Sledge
IPC Ice Sledge Hockey World Championships
IPC Ice Sledge Hockey World Championships